This is a list of Canadian films slated for release in 2021:

See also
 2021 in Canada
 2021 in Canadian television

References

External links
Feature Films Released In 2021 With Country of Origin Canada at IMDb

2021

Canada